Momo is a comune (municipality) in the Province of Novara in the Italian region Piedmont, located about  northeast of Turin and about  northwest of Novara.

Momo borders the following municipalities: Barengo, Bellinzago Novarese, Briona, Caltignaga, Oleggio, and Vaprio d'Agogna.

The Oratory of the Holiest Trinity is located two kilometres north of the town.

References

External links
 Official website

Momo, Piedmont